Job rotation is a technique used by some employers to rotate their employees' assigned jobs throughout their employment. Employers practice this technique for a number of reasons. It was designed to promote flexibility of employees and to keep employees interested into staying with the company/organization which employs them. There is also research that shows how job rotations help relieve the stress of employees who work in a job that requires manual labor.

Objectives

Employee Learning
Rotation making employees more versatile
Gives employees a broader understanding of the business allowing them to be better prepared to be promoted to management.
Employer Learning
Using job rotation employers can learn their individual worker's strengths
Employers receive a flexible and knowledgeable workforce that can be sourced throughout the company or agency.
Employee Motivation 
Rotation reduces boredom
More knowledge of the company as a whole may lead to more promotions.

Along with the company providing the opportunities and training for job rotation, the employees who participate in job rotation learn more than the one job specification deemed to them, benefiting them in the long run in case of an open position on moving up in the company or a position opening up in another firm. Along with employees benefiting, companies benefit as well. The business can hire fewer people since the majority of their staff will be able to be versatile in the job functions that the company may demand, saving the company more money and possibly giving the current employees a better salary.

Job rotation is beneficial to the company in terms of productivity and reducing the leave of absence workers take throughout the year. A study was conducted to see what motivates employees in their job performance. Job security was among the least motivators. Employees wanted a sense of responsibility and pride in their tasks performed. Job rotation was created for small crews to see if the company could produce a greater employee satisfaction, desire to become comfortable in their job functions, and decrease the desire to avoid their overtime duty.

Some employees are paid more for they are presenting that they are worth a greater amount since they can perform more than one job function and thus makes a higher incentive for more employees to be able to perform better in the workplace. 
It is a common perception to see that employees who normally opt into the program of job rotation that these individuals tend to have  "higher perceived skills" and are more likely to be promoted.

Sometimes job rotation is practiced for the individual worker's health benefit. This practice helps rotates the individual tasks and muscle movements. It reduces the stress of an average workday so that the workers do not feel the tension in their muscles as well as can keep up in their demanding workplace. There has been electromyographic studies on this technique from mining to assembly lines.

Job rotation also gives a firm a back-up plan in the case a work-gap is created in the firm.

Job rotation in action

Semco Partners 
Semco is a Brazilian firm known for implementing job rotation in order to discourage key people from keeping trade secrets which might get lost should they leave, and because it forces the company to develop more than one expert in any particular field.

Toyo Kogyo Company 
Toyo Kogyo Company is the Japanese firm that now produces Mazda automobiles. Toyo Kogyo has been practicing job rotation for over 20 years as a direct result of the oil embargo of the 1960s. Toyo looked to job rotation to fill gaps in experience due to the cutbacks needed during a downturn in the economy. This has resulted in company with a very efficient workforce that is more knowledgeable than their more specialized competitors.

Intel Corporation 
Intel Corporation now uses job rotation as a means to fill temporary positions from within their own organization. In 11 months Intel filled about 1300 jobs lasting from weeks to years. These positions were available in various fields such as HR, Marketing, Finance and Product development.

Workers

Benefits 
Job rotation may also be used to alleviate the physical and mental stresses endured by employees when working at the same position, year after year. By allowing employees to rotate to other positions, the risk factors for some types of musculoskeletal disorders may be reduced. Job Rotation is also believed to have the ability to decrease the amount of boredom and monotony experienced by employees who work the same position for extended periods of time. Job rotation caters to the employee's preferences in a variety of tasks, letting them be more flexible in their positions while endowing workers with a wide range of skills. This also allows the worker job security by developing multiple skills instead of specializing in one aspect. In times of urgency or emergency employees in job rotation are prepared to deal with unusual operations other more specialized workers may not be able to.

Drawbacks 
There are some negative attributes associated with job rotation. Firstly, some positions within a company may not be eligible for rotation. There may be positions within a company that may be specialized due to technology or may require highly skilled workers. These positions may not fit the profile for rotation opportunities because of the costs involved to train the workers. Another problem faced by companies is that some employ unionized workers that may be resistant to job rotation due to standard union practices.

Private sector

Benefits 
Employers are able to evaluate employees not only for their output but also for their personality traits and team work skills. "Output measures may easily be translated into attributes such as leadership abilities, technical competence, relations with others and judgement." Job rotation benefits the private sector by allowing workers to become flexible in skills needed throughout the company not just in one section or division, this allows companies to benefit through lower costs of needing to train new employees to do the same job. There are different reasons a company may choose to use job rotation such as using job rotation as a learning mechanism. Research suggests that there are significant benefits that may out weigh the costs involved with training employees for diversified positions. This employment opportunity has an effect of boosting morale and self efficacy.

Drawbacks

Cost of job rotation 
The cost of job rotation can be directly linked to the productive gains made through specialization.

Theory determining the benefit to specialization-

(1) Y=f(XuX2)."We will refer to the inputs as "jobs" that must be performed in order to produce the output. Suppose the firm employees two (initially) identical workers, each of whom is capable of performing both jobs. Thus in a two-period model, each worker could produce the same amount in the first period. By assuming the workers are identical in their intrinsic skills, we focus on the effect of the organization of work related skills. According to a well-known principle spelled out by Adam Smith, a specialized worker improves his or her skill over time by repetitively performing the same task. The gain from specializations thus arises in the second period if workers remain in the same job for both periods. In that case, we assume that the workers can produce more in the second period. By contrast, if the workers switch jobs in the second period, then each produces in the second period the same output that his or her counterpart had produced in the first period. To capture this we let Y1 denote the total output in the first period, and Y2, and Y2, denote the output in the second period under rotation and specialization respectively. When workers rotate jobs in the second period, Y2,= Y1; when they specialize and remain in the same job, Y2>Y1. Specialization thus yields greater output over the two periods by the amount Y2−Y2. This differential represents the cost of job rotation in terms of forgone output."A problem faced by companies is the possibility of having to pay incentives to workers for cooperation with the job rotation implementation which can lead towards inequality.

Public sector

Benefits 
Job rotation in the public sector can be used to create communication networks between agencies. This is a benefit for agencies this in times of interagency involvement, or times of emergency."Interagency assignments can promote networks among personnel from the host and home agencies. Job rotation programs can be designed with a formal component to encourage networking, or networks can be established informally through day-to-day interactions between the individual and his or her peers at the host agency.""Depending on the assignment, an individual can build specific skills needed for interagency collaboration, such as how to plan, lead, and execute interagency efforts. Several experts contend that the best way to teach people to lead in a collaborative environment is to provide them with an opportunity to do so."

Drawbacks 
Drawbacks from Job Rotation in the public sector are often affected the most by lack of cooperation between the agencies involved. Each agency must come into the project fully or the project is likely to fail; making these projects often hard to create or manage. Uneven exchanged in workforce talent can occur when one agency sends skilled personnel to another agency only to receive lower skilled personnel in return. This not only affects the consistency of work coming out of the first agency, but also has the effect of making managers more apprehensible to the aspect of future programs. Employees in these situations oftentimes feel that their careers are put on hold the moment they participate in rotation. Employees feel their contributions at other agencies will not be valued as much by their home agency. Employees feel they will be looked over and miss future opportunities due to lack of recognition and difference in location.

"These programs are not easy to design and manage effectively, and can impose significant costs on the individuals and organizations involved. Cultural differences that exist among different agencies, funding streams, and authorities that flow toward a single agency rather than toward enterprise-level goals are additional factors that complicate agencies’ abilities to work together to design a win-win program."

References

Further reading
 
 
 

Vocational education
Human resource management
Employment
Occupations